Taufkirchen is a municipality  in the district of Erding in Bavaria in Germany.

Taufkirchen is the location of the Wasserschloss Taufkirchen, a moated castle over 700 years old.

References

Erding (district)